Kwon Oh-son (born February 3, 1959) is a Korean football defender who played for South Korea in the 1980 Asian Cup. He also played for Seoul Metropolitan Government, FC Seoul (then known as Lucky-Goldstar Hwangso) and Ulsan Hyundai (then known as Hyundai Horangi).

As a manager, he had managed Seoul Metropolitan Government, before moving to Brunei to coach various national teams since 2007. He was the head coach of the full national team of Brunei in 2016 as well as in 2018. His greatest success was the 2012 Hassanal Bolkiah Trophy with the Brunei under-21 team. His tenure with the Wasps ended in March 2019.

International Record

Honours

Team
 Hassanal Bolkiah Trophy: 2012 (As head coach)

Individual
 
 Order of Setia Negara Brunei Fourth Class (PSB) (2012)
  Meritorius Service Medal (PJK) (2012)

References

External links

 Kwon Oh-son Interview

South Korean footballers
South Korea international footballers
1959 births
K League 1 players
Goyang KB Kookmin Bank FC players
Expatriate football managers in Brunei
Brunei national football team managers
FC Seoul players
Ulsan Hyundai FC players
Living people
Association football defenders
South Korean football managers
1980 AFC Asian Cup players